Mervyn is a masculine given name and occasionally a surname which is of Old Welsh origin, with elements mer, probably meaning "marrow", and myn, meaning "eminent".

Despite the misconception of the letter 'V' being an English spelling, through Roman occupation of Britain, the Welsh language (at least for spelling) was Latinised and through centuries of evolution of the Welsh language, the modern Welsh spelling for Mervyn is Merfyn.

People with the given name
 Mervyn or Merfyn Frych, king of Gwynedd (c. 825-844)
 Mervyn Archdall (disambiguation), various persons
 Mervyn S. Bennion (1887–1941), US Navy captain killed in the attack on Pearl Harbor, posthumously awarded the Medal of Honor 
 Mervyn Bishop (born 1945), professional photographer, the first Aboriginal Australian to work on a metropolitan daily newspaper
 Mervyn Carrick (born 1946), Northern Ireland politician
 Mervyn Davies, Baron Davies of Abersoch (born 1952), former banker and UK government minister
 Mervyn Davies (1946–2012), Welsh former rugby union player
 Mervyn Day (born 1955), English former football goalkeeper
 Mervyn de Silva (1929-1999), Sri Lankan Sinhala journalist
 Mervyn Dillon (born 1974), West Indian cricketer
 Mervyn M. Dymally (born 1926), American politician, first Trinidadian Lieutenant Governor of California
 Mervyn Fernandez (born 1959), former National Football League and Canadian Football League wide receiver
 Mervyn Fonseka, Solicitor General of Sri Lanka from 1943-1945
 Merv Griffin (1925-2007), American singer, television host and media mogul
 Merv Harvey (1918–1995), Australian cricketer
 Mervyn Hill (1902–1948), Welsh cricketer
 Merv Hughes (born 1961), Australian cricketer
 Mervyn Jayasuriya (died 2008), Sri Lankan Sinhala radio announcer
 Mervyn Johns (1899–1992), Welsh film and television actor
 Mervyn King (economist) (born 1948), British economist, Governor of the Bank of England
 Mervyn King (judge), former judge of the Supreme Court of South Africa and chairman of the King Committee on Corporate Governance
 Mervyn King (darts player) (born 1966), British darts player
 Mervyn King (bowls) (born 1966), English bowls player
 Mervyn Kitchen (born 1940), English former first-class cricketer and international umpire
 Mervyn LeRoy (1900–1987), American film director, producer and sometime actor
 Mervyn Maynard (-2017), Aboriginal Australian jockey
 Mervyn Middlecoat (1940–1971), Pakistan Air Force wing commander
 Mervyn Peake (1911–1968), English modernist writer, artist, poet and illustrator, best known for his Gormenghast series
 Mervyn Pike, Baroness Pike (1918–2004), British politician
 Mervyn Rose (born 1930), Australian tennis player
 Mervyn Silva (born 1944), controversial Sri Lankan politician
 Mervyn Spence (born 1965-6), Northern Irish musician
 Mervyn Stockwood (1913–1995), Anglican Bishop of Southwark
 Mervyn Taylor (born 1931), Irish former politician
 Mervyn Tuchet, 2nd Earl of Castlehaven (1593–1631), English nobleman convicted of rape and sodomy
 Mervyn Warren (born 1964), American film composer, record producer, songwriter, pianist and vocalist
 Muff Winwood (born 1943), English songwriter and record producer
 Mervyn Wood (1917–2006), Australian rower

People with the surname
 Audley Mervyn (1603?–1675), lawyer and politician in Ireland
 Audley Mervyn (died 1717), Irish MP for Strabane and County Tyrone - see Tyrone (Parliament of Ireland constituency)
 Audley Mervyn (died 1746), Irish MP for County Tyrone - see Tyrone (Parliament of Ireland constituency)
 William Mervyn (1912–1976), English actor

Fictional characters
 Mervyn Bunter, a butler in Dorothy Sayers' stories featuring Lord Peter Wimsey
 Mervyn Pumpkinhead, in The Sandman comic book
 Mervyn, Sheriff of Rottingham, in the Mel Brooks film Robin Hood: Men in Tights
 Sir Mervyn, a paladin in the video game Dragon Quest VII
 the title character of Arthur Mervyn, a 1799 novel written by Charles Brockden Brown

See also
 Mervyn's, a defunct American department store chain
 Merlin (disambiguation)
 Mervin (disambiguation)
 Merwin (disambiguation)

References

Masculine given names